José Martins Leal (born 23 March 1965) is a Portuguese retired footballer who played as a left back.

Club career
Leal was born in Sá da Bandeira, Portuguese Angola. During his professional career he represented Académico de Viseu FC (his first and last club, where he retired at age 38 in the third division), Sporting Clube de Portugal, C.F. Os Belenenses, F.C. Felgueiras, C.F. Estrela da Amadora and C.D. Santa Clara.

With the Lisbon club, Leal was first-choice during most of his five-year spell, also scoring regularly for a defensive player, but, in his last season, was demoted to third-string after youth graduate Paulo Torres and newly signed Budimir Vujačić, and left the Lions without any silverware conquered.

International career
Leal earned 15 caps for Portugal – one goal – almost all of them coming during the UEFA Euro 1992 qualifying campaign, as the national team did not make it to the final stages in Sweden.

|}

References

External links

1965 births
Living people
People from Lubango
Portuguese footballers
Association football defenders
Primeira Liga players
Liga Portugal 2 players
Segunda Divisão players
Académico de Viseu F.C. players
Sporting CP footballers
C.F. Os Belenenses players
F.C. Felgueiras players
C.F. Estrela da Amadora players
C.D. Santa Clara players
Portugal under-21 international footballers
Portugal international footballers
Portuguese football managers
Académico de Viseu F.C. managers
C.D. Tondela managers
Portuguese people of Angolan descent